The UniCredit Czech Open is a professional tennis tournament played on outdoor red clay courts. It is currently part of the ATP Challenger Tour. It is held annually at the Prostějov Tennis Complex in Prostějov, Czech Republic, since 1994.

Jan Hájek, Radek Štěpánek, Jiří Veselý are the singles record holders with three titles won. Jaroslav Levinský, winning three times the doubles titles, is the record holder for that tournament category.

Past finals

Singles

Doubles

External links
Official website
ITF search 

 
ATP Challenger Tour
Clay court tennis tournaments
Tennis tournaments in the Czech Republic
Recurring sporting events established in 1994